Laurent Brunet (born 1967) is a French César Award-winning cinematographer  for Séraphine (2008) by Martin Provost. He is widely known for his work on the films of Raphael Nadjari. Brunet shot all five of Raphael Nadjari's feature films as well as Amos Gitai's Free Zone and Keren Yedaya's Or (My Treasure) as well as Christophe Honoré's The Beautiful Person.

Selected filmography
2019: Enormous
2019: Arab Blues
2018: Tel Aviv on Fire
2016: Trainee Day
2016: Irréprochable
2015: Papa lumière
2015: Boomerang 
2015: Microbe & Gasoline 
2014: That Lovely Girl 
2012: Maman 
2008: The Beautiful Person 
2008: Séraphine 
2007: Le Blues de l'Orient 
2007: Vous êtes de la police ?
2007: Le Fils de L'Épicier 
2007: Tehilim 
2007: Plum Rain 
2005: Free Zone
2005: Little Jerusalem
2004: Or (My Treasure) 
2004: Avanim 
2002: Apartment#5C 
2001: I Am Josh Polonski's Brother 
1999: The Shade (1998 film)

References

External links
 

Living people
1967 births
French cinematographers
César Award winners